Club de Fútbol Fuenlabrada Promesas Madrid 2021, formerly Flat Earth Fútbol Club, UD Móstoles Balompié and CDC Comercial, is a Spanish football team based in Madrid, in the autonomous community of Madrid.
Founded in 1969, it plays in Tercera División RFEF – Group 7, holding home games at Campo Municipal La Aldehuela, with a capacity of 2,000 people.

History

Móstoles Balompié was formed in 2016, as the club took the place of CDC Comercial (club founded in 1969 and federated in 1983), who was at the time a reserve team of RCD Carabanchel. The club achieved promotion to the Preferente (fifth tier) in their first season, and promoted to Tercera División in 2019.

In late June 2019, Móstoles Balompié reached international attention after their president Javi Poves opted to change the club's name to Flat Earth FC, and publicly endorsed modern flat Earth beliefs. The club also moved from the Madrid suburbs of Móstoles to the city of Madrid.

In December 2020, Poves resigned from his president role. The club was later renamed CD Elemental Madrid 2021.

On 6 July 2021, Flat Earth was bought out by CF Fuenlabrada and became their reserve team, being renamed CF Fuenlabrada Promesas and taking their place in the new Tercera División RFEF. The club's former B-side, CF Fuenlabrada B, became the second reserve team.

Season to season

CDC Comercial

Móstoles Balompié

Flat Earth

Fuenlabrada Promesas

2 seasons in Tercera División
1 season in Tercera División RFEF

Current squad

References

External links

Association football clubs established in 1969
1969 establishments in Spain
Football clubs in the Community of Madrid
Flat Earth
CF Fuenlabrada
Spanish reserve football teams